The Grenada Railroad (reporting mark GRYR) is a 180-mile long (290 km) shortline railroad that runs from Southaven, Mississippi to Canton, Mississippi, along former Illinois Central Railroad trackage. GRYR interchanges at Jackson, Mississippi, with the Canadian National, and at Memphis, Tennessee with CN, Norfolk Southern, Union Pacific, and CSX. The main commodities the Class III railroad hauls include chemicals, flour, lumber, paper, plastics, and petroleum. The Grenada Railroad is operated by RailUSA.

History
The line was part of Illinois Central Railroad's Grenada District and was mostly used by its premier Chicago-New Orleans passenger trains, the City of New Orleans and the Panama Limited, running in the postwar period at speeds up to 100 miles per hour on some stretches. The line had many hills and curves, making it unsuitable for long freight trains, which mainly used Illinois Central's "Yazoo District" several miles to the west, through the flat Mississippi Delta.  It is notable as the line on which Casey Jones, the famed railroader, was killed.

On September 10, 1995 Amtrak's City of New Orleans operated over the Grenada District for the last time.  A few years later in 1998, Canadian National bought the Illinois Central Railroad and diverted more traffic over to the Yazoo District.

Grenada Railway, 2009-2018
The Grenada Railway was formed in 2009 when Canadian National spun off the 175-mile branch line from the Tennessee border south through Grenada to Canton due to low traffic. On May 14, 2009, the Grenada Star reported, "The Grenada Branch Line, the Water Valley Branch Line, and the Natchez Branch Line were sold to Grenada Railway, LLC, and Natchez Railway, LLC, both non-carrier affiliates of V&S Railway and A&K Railroad Materials." The 81-mile section running south from Grenada to Canton was taken out of service in 2011 and was the subject of a dispute between Grenada Railway, local towns and counties along the tracks and the Surface Transportation Board. GRYR claimed there was not enough traffic to justify keeping the line open, while the towns and counties bordering the tracks argued that abandoning the railroad would hurt them economically. The railroad eventually withdrew its application to abandon the trackage in November 2011.

In 2015, the North Central Mississippi Regional Railroad Authority purchased the entire rail line for $43 million from previous owner A&K Railroad Materials.  The state of Mississippi contributed a $30 million bond, while Iowa Pacific Holdings paid the remaining $13 million. Iowa Pacific then leased the line from the Authority, the lease payments being applied to pay back the state bond.  It was reported that Iowa Pacific would continue to operate the Grenada Railway, as well as work to rebuild the trackage between Grenada and Canton. Currently, tracks have been in use for car storage as far south as Winona, Mississippi.

In 2016 Iowa Pacific sent their passenger train (decorated in the colors of the Illinois Central) to Batesville, MS to run a polar express train. The train was such a success that Iowa Pacific bought a warehouse and planned to run regular dinner trains.

Grenada Railroad, 2018-
In August 2018 it was announced that International Rail Partners (IRP) had concluded a lease-purchase agreement with the NCMRRA, and would operate the line under the new name Grenada Railroad LLC.

In October 2018 it was announced that IRP had partnered with Equity Group Investments in a $200 million deal to form a subsidiary, RailUSA LLC; the Grenada Railroad was described in the announcement as "RailUSA's first acquisition."  In June 2019, RailUSA acquired a second shortline, the Florida Gulf & Atlantic Railroad, running across the length of the Florida Panhandle. Currently, They are upgrading the track to class 3 (40 MPH)

In November 2022 Grenada Railroad Receives 286K GWR Certification.

References 

Mississippi railroads
Rail infrastructure in Mississippi